Bosona, also HD 206610, is an orange giant star in the constellation of Aquarius. It is a K-type giant star with an apparent magnitude of 6.249, which, according to the Bortle scale, makes it faintly visible to the naked eye from dark rural skies. This star is spinning slowly with a projected rotational velocity of 1.77 km/s.

Naming
The star HD 206610 and its planet HD 206610 b are named Bosona and Naron respectively. The names were selected in the NameExoWorlds campaigns by Bosnia and Herzegovina during the 100th anniversary of the IAU. Naron is one of the names given to the Neretva river in Herzegovina originating with the Romans (Naro, Narona, Narenta, Nerenta), while in local tradition the name is said to go back even earlier with the Celts who called it Nera Etwa, which means the Flowing Divinity.

The host star HD 206610 is named Bosona in accordance with the historic name for Bosnia, Horion Bosona, described in De Administrando Imperio by Porphyrogenitus in 10rth century, and its namesake the river Bosna's ancient name Bosona (Bosina, Basina, Basante).

Planetary system
HD 206610 has one known planet, HD 206610 b named Naron, discovered in 2010 using the radial velocity method.

References

External links
 Image HD 206610
Bosona eSky

Aquarius (constellation)
206610
K-type giants
107251 
BD-08 5719
Planetary systems with one confirmed planet
Bosona